= Si Land =

Japanese manga series

- First tankōbon volume cover

シランド (Shirando)
- Genre: Adventure, fantasy
- Manga
- Written by: Ryo Sumiyoshi
- Published by: Kodansha
- English publisher: Kodansha
- Imprint: Morning KC
- Magazine: Comic Days
- Original run: August 25, 2025 – present
- Volumes: 3

Si Land (Japanese: シランド, Hepburn: Shirando) is a Japanese manga series written and illustrated by Ryo Sumiyoshi. It began serialization on Kodansha's Comic Days manga website in August 2025.

== Synopsis ==
The series is set in a world where dogs control the land on the world's only continent, and cats rule the seas. Jean is a dog who was raised by his mother Rosa and his adoptive cat father Azul. After his mother is kidnapped by cat pirates and he finds the legendary Urgear, he teams up with a group of cats and their leader Zahab to find his mother and Si Land, a home in which dogs and cats can live in peace.

== Publication ==
Written and illustrated by Ryo Sumiyoshi, Si Land began serialization on Kodansha's Comic Days manga website on August 25, 2025. Its chapters have been compiled into three tankōbon volumes as of September 2026.

The series' chapters are simultaneously published in English on Kodansha's K Manga app.

No.	Release date	ISBN
1	January 14, 2026	978-4-06-542225-0
2	April 8, 2026	978-4-06-543238-9
3	September 9, 2026	978-4-06-544935-6

== Reception ==
The series was nominated for the twelfth Next Manga Award in 2026 in the web category.
